Beornhæth was an Anglo-Saxon nobleman in Northumbria in the reign of King Ecgfrith (ruled 671–685). He was the first of his family to come to notice.

Eddius's Life of Saint Wilfrid, recounting Ecgfrith's campaign against the Picts in 671 or 672, states that he was accompanied by the "sub-king" Beornhæth. It is presumed that Beornhæth ruled a part of northern Bernicia, perhaps in modern Lothian where there was a major Northumbrian fortress at Dunbar. In 8th century Northumbria, a large number of noble families claimed descent from the legendary King Ida, or from the Deiran royal house, but it is not known whether Beornhæth claimed descent from Ida. 

Beornhæth's son Berhtred (died c. 698), also called Berht, commanded King Ecgfrith's punitive expedition to kingdom of Brega, in Ireland, in 684. Beorhtred's paternity is known from the notice of his death in the Irish annals, where he is called the son of Beornhæth. 

Historians presume that Berhtfrith, "a nobleman second in rank only to [King Osred]", was a son of Berhtred. Berhtfrith was largely responsible for the defeat of the would-be King Eadwulf, and the installation of Aldfrith's son Osred on the throne as child-king in 705. Berhtfrith appears to have achieved this by making peace between Osred's supporters, and those of Bishop Wilfrid.

Notes

References
 (VW) Eddius Stephanus, The Life of Saint Wilfrid in Webb & Farmer (eds), The Age of Bede. London: Penguin, 1983. 
 Anderson, Alan Orr, Early Sources of Scottish History A.D 500–1286, volume 1. Reprinted with corrections. Stamford: Paul Watkins, 1990. 
 Kirby, D.P., The Earliest English Kings. London: Unwin Hyman, 1991. 
 Yorke, Barbara, Kings and Kingdoms in Early Anglo-Saxon England. London: Seaby, 1990. 

Anglo-Saxon ealdormen
685 deaths
Year of birth unknown